Carmen Gheorghe is activist who works for Roma women’s rights. She is the president of E-Romnja which promotes Roma women's rights. She was awarded the International Women of Courage Award in 2022.

References

Recipients of the International Women of Courage Award
Romani rights activists
Living people
Year of birth missing (living people)
Place of birth missing (living people)
Women's rights activists